The 2014 Odisha Legislative Assembly election was held in April 2014, concurrently with the general election. The elections were held in the state in two phases. The results were declared on 16 May 2014.

The ruling party, Biju Janata Dal, upon gaining majority of seats formed the government again, with incumbent Chief Minister Naveen Patnaik, continuing office for another term.

Results

Elected members

References

State Assembly elections in Odisha
2014 State Assembly elections in India
April 2014 events in India
2010s in Odisha